Andreas Malin (born 31 January 1994) is a Liechtensteiner footballer who plays for Austrian third-tier Eliteliga Vorarlberg club FC Rot-Weiß Rankweil.

International career
He is a member of the Liechtenstein national football team, making his debut in a friendly match against Iceland on 6 June 2016. Malin also made 17 appearances for the Liechtenstein U21 from 2013 to 2016.

References

1994 births
Living people
Liechtenstein footballers
Liechtenstein international footballers
Association football defenders
FC Dornbirn 1913 players
SW Bregenz players
USV Eschen/Mauren players
2. Liga (Austria) players
Austrian Regionalliga players
Liechtenstein expatriate footballers
Expatriate footballers in Austria